Anita Rosa Zarnowiecki (born 26 May 1954) is a Swedish freestyle and medley swimmer who won a bronze medal in the 4 × 100 m freestyle relay at the 1970 European Aquatics Championships. She competed at the 1972 Summer Olympics in four events and finished sixth and eighth in the 4 × 100 m freestyle and medley relays, respectively.

Being Jewish, she competed at the 1973 Maccabiah Games in Israel. At 19 years of age, she won seven gold medals, including the 100 m backstroke, the 400 m freestyle, and the 200 m individual medley, surpassing the record of five medals set by American swimmer Mark Spitz in 1969, and a silver medal in the 800 m freestyle.

Her twin brother, Bernt Zarnowiecki, also competed in freestyle swimming at the 1972 Summer Olympics, and in the 1973 Maccabiah Games.

References

1954 births
Swedish female medley swimmers
Swimmers at the 1972 Summer Olympics
Swedish female freestyle swimmers
Olympic swimmers of Sweden
Jewish swimmers
Swedish Jews
Living people
European Aquatics Championships medalists in swimming
Maccabiah Games gold medalists for Sweden
Maccabiah Games medalists in swimming
Competitors at the 1973 Maccabiah Games
Swimmers from Gothenburg
20th-century Swedish women